The Hollings Center for International Dialogue is a non-profit, non-governmental organization dedicated to fostering dialogue between the United States and countries with predominantly Muslim populations in the Middle East, North Africa, South Asia, Eurasia and Europe. In pursuit of this mission, the Hollings Center convenes dialogue conferences that generate new thinking on important international issues and deepen channels of communication across opinion leaders and experts.

History
The conception of the Hollings Center emerged from two primary objectives. First was the need for an organization focused on opening and reinforcing networks and connections between the US and the predominantly Muslim world, particularly in the post-9/11 environment. Second was a strong desire to preserve the Palazzo Corpi, the historic former U.S. Consulate in Istanbul, Turkey.
The Hollings Center was established as a non-governmental organization by the U.S. Congress in 2004, primarily through the efforts of Senators Ernest F. Hollings (D-SC) and Judd Gregg (R-NH). Specifically, Congress called on the center to "develop programs of cooperative study, training and research for students and scholars to exchange views and ideas" between the United States and the Muslim world. Congress also specifically designated that this center would occupy the Palazzo Corpi. Located in Istanbul's historic Beyoğlu neighborhood (formerly Pera), the Palazzo Corpi housed the official U.S. presence in Istanbul until 2003. It is one of the US' oldest diplomatic holdings and the Hollings Center was created in part to ensure that the historic Palazzo would remain part of the United States' international heritage.

A steering committee, led by the Council of American Overseas Research Centers, developed a series of dialogue conferences to serve as the Hollings Center's signature program. Three categories of dialogue conferences emerged: Next Generation Dialogues, Regional Policy Dialogues and Higher Education Dialogues. In addition, a small grants program was created in conjunction with dialogue conferences, awarding conference participants modest sums to fund projects building on dialogue topics. More recently, the center has begun a Speaker Series to expand upon dialogue outcomes to a broader public audience.

The center began operations in 2005, holding its first dialogue conference in May of that year. Since then, the Hollings Center has held roughly 30 Dialogue Conferences, hosting over 600 participants from about 40 countries.
Officially named the International Center for Middle Eastern-Western Dialogue, the center is more commonly known as the Hollings Center, in recognition of Senator Hollings whose efforts were crucial to its foundation.  Senator Hollings retired in 2005 having achieved a notable 39-year career in the U.S. Senate.

The Hollings Center is registered as a non-profit, tax-exempt 501(c)(3) organization in the United States and as a foreign non-profit organization in Turkey. The Board of Directors is currently led by Ambassador Nicholas A. Veliotes, former Assistant Secretary of State for Near Eastern Affairs.

Palazzo Corpi
The Palazzo Corpi is one of the oldest U.S. government-owned diplomatic premises in the world. First built in 1830 by Genoese merchant Ignazio Corpi, American ambassador John G. A. Leishman rented the building for use as the U.S. legation and residence in 1882. Centrally located in the Beyoğlu neighborhood (formerly Pera), the Palazzo Corpi's classical façade features an American eagle and crest. The interior is decorated with frescoes of mythological scenes, marble flooring, and etched glasswork.

In 1907, Ambassador Leishman used his personal funds to purchase the property for  Ottoman liras, having decided that the US should own rather than lease the building. Leishman anticipated reimbursement from the U.S. government upon a return trip to Washington and was surprised to find that Congress had no plans for this repayment. Rather than accepting the personal expenditure, Leishman hosted several members of Congress to a party, inviting them to drink and play poker late into the night. Ambassador Leishman challenged the Congress members to a poker game over the status of the Palazzo and won, resulting in Congress repaying Leishman for the Palazzo and granting it two unique titles: the first diplomatic building purchased by the U.S. government and the only such building acquired through a card game.

The Palazzo served as the U.S. embassy and residence from 1906 and then as the consulate general from 1937 until 2003, after the designation of Ankara as Turkey's capital in 1923 resulted in the transfer of embassy activities away from Istanbul. Throughout this history, the Palazzo Corpi served as a symbol of U.S. public diplomacy in the region. In 2003, the U.S. State Department moved the Consul General to a more modern facility on the European shore of the Bosphorous. Many of the diplomats and officials who had worked at the Palazzo Corpi were determined to preserve the building's history and significance to American foreign policy. Congress created the Hollings Center in 2004 to fill this role, designating the center to host programs that will reinforce communication and understanding between the US and the Muslim world.

To best preserve the history and structure of the Palazzo Corpi, the U.S. State Department negotiated on the Hollings Center's behalf for a Turkish holding company to spearhead renovations and restoration. This process was completed in early 2015 when the Palazzo Corpi reopened as a hotel and conference center. Featured in this new space is the Hollings Center's Istanbul presence, allowing for the continuation of the Palazzo Corpi's historic tradition of promoting dialogue and fostering cross-cultural cooperation.

Members of the Board of Directors

Emeritus Members
 Ernest F. Hollings (Hon., Founding Chair)
 Stephen J. Solarz (Hon.)

Active Members
 Deborah K. Jones (Ambassador, retired, Chair)
 Kate Eltrich (Treasurer)
 Richard A. Detweiler
 John A. Gastright
 Nader Habibi
 Steve Hartell

References

External links
 Official website

Non-profit organizations based in Washington, D.C.
International relations
United States–Middle Eastern relations
Turkey–United States relations